Botlikh (also spelled Botlix) is an Andic language of the Northeast Caucasian language family spoken by the Botlikhs in the Buikhe and Ashino villages in southwestern Dagestan, Russia by approximately 210 people, according to the 2010 census.

References

External links
The peoples of the Red Book: Botlikhs

Northeast Caucasian languages
Andic languages
Languages of Russia
Endangered Caucasian languages